Bent André Skammelsrud (born 18 May 1966) is a Norwegian former professional footballer, most known as an important midfielder for Rosenborg BK. He has eleven consecutive championships in the Norwegian Premier League, and three times he won the Norwegian Football Cup.

Biography
Skammelsrud was born in Sarpsborg. He played 272 matches for Rosenborg BK in the Norwegian Premier League, scoring 57 goals. Before joining Rosenborg, he had played for Drøbak/Frogn, Frigg, and the Swedish club Malmö FF. He also played 38 matches for the Norwegian national team, scoring seven goals. He was in roster for Euro 2000.

Except from his debut season in 1991, Skammelsrud won the Norwegian Premier League every season as a Rosenborg player. He was captain of the team for several seasons and a key player in the club's UEFA Champions League matches during the last half of the 1990s. He joined Bayer Leverkusen in January 1998, but returned to Rosenborg only five months later because of family reasons.

Skammelsrud retired after the 2002 season, unwillingly, after Åge Hareide didn't renew his contract with the club.

Honours

Club
Rosenborg
Norwegian Premier League Championship (11): 1992, 1993, 1994, 1995, 1996, 1997, 1998, 1999, 2000, 2001, 2002
Norwegian Football Cup Win: 1992, 1995, 1999

Individual
Kniksen award as midfielder of the year in 1997
Kniksen's honour award in 2001 (together with Roar Strand)

References

External links
 

1966 births
Living people
People from Sarpsborg
Association football midfielders
Norwegian footballers
Norway international footballers
Norway under-21 international footballers
Norwegian expatriate footballers
Frigg Oslo FK players
Rosenborg BK players
Malmö FF players
Bayer 04 Leverkusen players
Eliteserien players
Allsvenskan players
Bundesliga players
UEFA Euro 2000 players
Expatriate footballers in Sweden
Drøbak-Frogn IL players
Expatriate footballers in Germany
Kniksen Award winners
Norwegian expatriate sportspeople in Sweden
Norwegian expatriate sportspeople in Germany
Sportspeople from Viken (county)